

Gmina Koluszki is an urban-rural gmina (administrative district) in Łódź East County, Łódź Voivodeship, in central Poland.

Villages
Apart from the town of Koluszki, Gmina Koluszki contains the villages and settlements of Będzelin, Borowa, Długie, Erazmów, Felicjanów, Gałków Duży, Gałków Mały, Gałkówek-Parcela, Jeziorko, Kaletnik, Katarzynów, Kazimierzów, Leosin, Lisowice, Nowy Redzeń, Przanowice, Regny, Różyca, Słotwiny, Stary Redzeń, Stefanów, Świny, Turobowice, Wierzchy, Żakowice and Zygmuntów.

Neighbouring gminas
Gmina Koluszki is bordered by the gminas of Andrespol, Brójce, Brzeziny, Budziszewice, Jeżów, Rogów, Rokiciny, Ujazd and Żelechlinek.

References
Polish official population figures 2006

Koluszki
Łódź East County